Pirwani (Aymara pirwa, piwra granary, -ni a suffix, "the one with a granary", hispanicized spelling Pirhuani) is a mountain in the Andes of Peru, about  high. It is located in the Puno Region, Melgar Province, on the border of the districts of Antauta and Nuñoa. Pirwani lies south of Kuntur Pata. The Pirwani River originates near the mountain. It is a right tributary of the Crucero River whose waters flow to Lake Titicaca.

References

Mountains of Peru
Mountains of Puno Region